Saʿd ibn Abī Waqqāṣ, also known as Saʿd ibn Mālik, was one of the companions of the Islamic prophet Muhammad, a military conqueror of Sasanian Persia and the founder of Kufa. Saʿd was the seventh free adult man to embrace Islam, which he did at the age of seventeen. Sa'd participated in all battles under Muhammad during their stay in Medina.

Sa'd was famous for his leadership in the Battle of al-Qadisiyyah and the conquest of the Sasanian capital Ctesiphon in 636. After the Battle of al-Qadisiyyah and the Siege of Ctesiphon (637), Sa'd served as the supreme commander of the Rashidun army in Iraq which conquered Khuzestan province and built the garrison city of Kufa before being replaced by the caliph Umar due to complaints regarding Sa'd's conduct. During the First Fitna, Sa'd was known for leading the neutral faction that contained the majority of the Companions of the Prophet and their followers, who refused to be involved in the civil war. Traditions of Chinese Muslims hold that he introduced Islam to China on diplomatic sojourns in 651, though these accounts are disputed.

Sunni historians and scholars regarded Sa'd as an honored figure due to his companionship with Muhammad, his inclusion as one of the ten to whom Paradise was promised, and his participation in the Battle of Badr, whose participants are collectively held in high esteem.

History 
Sa'd was one of the first to accept Islam. He was seventeen years old when he accepted Islam, although Ibn Abd al-Barr reported that Sa'd embraced Islam at age nineteen. It was said by Ibn Ishaq that Sa'd was one of several individuals invited to Islam by Abu Bakr. Sa'd's mother opposed her son's conversion and threatened to go on a hunger strike until he left Islam, but Sa'd did not heed his mother's threat and stayed with his new faith. His mother finally yielded due to Sa'd's firmness towards Islam. Chroniclers reported that Muhammad told Sa'd that God praised his firmness in his faith, but also told Sa'd to be kinder to his mother, as filial piety is an important virtue in Islam. Sa'd's brother Amir also converted, prompting their mother to undergo another hunger strike, which likewise failed to deter her son.

According to Ibn Hisham's recension of Ibn Ishaq's sira, Sa'd and a number of other Muslims were criticized by a group of polytheists in Mecca. This criticism prompted Sa'd to wound one of the polytheists with a camel bone, which Ibn Ishaq deems "the first blood to be shed in Islam".

According to the Fath al-Bari of Ibn Hajar al-Asqalani, Sa'd migrated to Medina before Muhammad along with Ibn Umm Maktum and Mus'ab ibn Umayr. He continued to practice Islam in Medina.

Early life in Medina 

As Sa'd and his siblings arrived in Medina, they immediately pledged allegiance to Muhammad. The Meccan migrants were termed muhajirun, while the local inhabitants of Medina were known as the Ansar. While in Medina, Sa'd was involved in most military operations mounted by the Muslims against the Quraysh of Mecca. Sa'd's first operation occurred nine months after the migration. He was tasked with leading 20 men to raid a Qurayshi caravan that passed Kharrar, located between Al-Juhfa and Mecca. This expedition failed, as the caravan escaped.

During a minor reconnaissance operation under Ubaydah ibn al-Harith in Rabigh shortly before the Battle of Badr, the team caught the attention of opposing Qurayshi fighters that began to chase them. Sa'd and his team immediately ran away, with some accounts stating that Sa'd performed a Parthian shot as he retreated. Ubaydah's team returned to Medina unscathed, and Sa'd prided himself on allowing the Muslim scouts to survive.

Battle of Badr 
During the march to Badr, Muhammad sent Sa'd, Ali, and Zubayr ibn al-Awwam to scout the enemy's movements, as the Muslim army that marched from Medina was originally intending to capture the rich caravan of Abu Sufyan ibn Harb instead of facing the main forces of the Meccan Quraysh under Abu Jahl ibn Hisham.

According to a chronicle, Sa'd's first feat of archery occurred during the Battle of Badr, in approximately the year 2 AH. In this battle, the Muslims formed a phalanx formation. A hadith states that in the midst of battle Sa'd prayed for his arrow to hit the enemy while stringing his bow, with Muhammad also praying for God to grant Sa'd's wish. Biographers noted that Sa'd's archery skills were troublesome for the polytheist forces during the Battle of Badr. According to another hadith, Sa'd also joined the close combat during the final phase of the battle as the Muslims began to gain the upper hand. Sa'd killed a Qurayshi champion named Sa'id ibn al-As and retrieved a sword known as Dhu al-Kutifah (ذا الكُتَيفَة), which he presented to Muhammad as a prize of war. Sa'd also reportedly managed to capture two Qurayshi soldiers during this battle.

Later historians dubbed Sa'd the "first Muslim archer" for his actions during this battle. Sa'd's teenage brother Umayr asked to participate in the battle, but Muhammad refused him due to his young age. Umayr continued to ask for permission to fight and was eventually granted it; he died in the course of the battle.

Protecting Muhammad in Uhud 

At the Battle of Uhud, Sa'd served in an archer regiment. As the Muslim army gained the upper hand, they were routed by a flanking maneuver by Khalid ibn al-Walid. The Muslim forces scattered, and Muhammad was separated from his soldiers except for about a dozen men, including Sa'd, a muhajirun warrior named Talha, the Medinese swordsman Abu Dujana, and about six or seven Ansari soldiers. The group was surrounded by enemy cavalry under Khalid as the Muslim fighters formed a close defensive formation and Sa'd shot his arrows next to Muhammad, who suffered an injury to his shoulder. The outnumbered and encircled Muslims fought until most of them were killed, except Muhammad, Talhah, Abu Dujana, and Sa'd, who tried to assist his comrades with his bow and arrow, despite the close combat. Sa'd resorted to firing multiple arrows at once in the dire situation.

Realizing how Sa'd was affecting the enemies, Muhammad gathered arrows for Sa'd and stood next to him while Sa'd continuously shot, allowing the encircled Muslims to retreat. As they managed to escape, Muhammad praised Sa'd for his actions.

Later, after Muhammad killed one of the remaining enemy pursuers with his javelin, Sa'd uttered a vow to kill his own brother, Utbah ibn Abi Waqqas, who fought on the side of the enemy, as Utbah had injured Muhammad during the encirclement.

After Uhud until the Ridda Wars 

Along with men such as Abu Bakr, Sa'd ibn Mu'adh, Zubayr ibn al-Awwam, Bilal ibn Rabah, Abbad ibn Bishr, and Abu Ayyub al-Ansari, Sa'd was a member of the Haras (personal bodyguard) unit of Muhammad. When Muhammad and Aisha participated in military expeditions, Sa'd was the one who guarded their tent at night.

Sa'd became one of the most important members of Medina's Muslim political and religious community after he participated in the Pledge of the Tree, as those who participated in the pledge were collectively praised in Sura Al-Fath. On the same day of the Pledge of the Tree, Sa'd also witnessed the ratification of the Treaty of Hudaybiyyah that created a ceasefire or pact of non-aggression between Medina and Mecca. Until the Expedition of Tabuk, Sa'd was recorded as participating in all battles under Muhammad, including the Battle of the Trench, the Expedition of al-Muraysi', the Siege of Khaybar, the Conquest of Mecca, the battles in Hunayn and Awtas, and the Siege of Ta'if.

When Muhammed died and Abu Bakr was named the first caliph, the Ridda Wars broke out throughout the Arabian Peninsula. Abu Bakr dispatched his elite forces under Usama ibn Zayd to pacify the northern border, while he gathered the rest of the army, including Sa'd, to engage the rebel invaders led by Tulayha in the Battle of Zhu Qissa. Ibn al-Jawzi and Nur ad-Din al-Halabi recorded that Sa'd instead joined the Expedition of Usama bin Zayd along with Umar, Sa'id ibn Zayd, Abu Ubayda ibn al-Jarrah, and Qatada ibn al-Nu'man. After the rebels were routed, Sa'd joined the army marching towards Dumat al-Jandal to crush several bedouin rebels there.

Battle of al-Qadisiyyah 

In 636, after the ascension of Umar ibn al-Khattab as second Caliph, Umar sent Sa'd to lead a corps towards Iraq to assist Abu Ubayd al-Thaqafi in the Muslim conquest of Persia. Al-Basalamah remarked that Umar mustered precisely 12,000 soldiers in Medina to serve under Sa'd. Before the army could be dispatched from Medina, a message from the Iraq front arrived, stating that Abu Ubayd was killed in action during the Battle of the Bridge and the Iraqi soldiers were forced to withdraw to south-west Iraq. This development caused Umar to change his plans. The caliph instructed Sa'd to march to Iraq with 6,000 soldiers, while also instructing the Rashidun armies in Iraq to merge Sa'd's forces with the forces of Arfajah, who brought 400 to 700 Azd cavalry, Jarir ibn Abdullah of al-Bajali and Al-Muthanna ibn Haritha of the Banu Shayban, as those three commanders have just defeated the Sassanid vanguard in the Battle of Buwaib. Umar appointed Sa'd as the commander and placed the other three under his command. Sa'd scavenged the Rashidun soldiers left in Iraq during his marches until he managed to collect 30,000 soldiers. According to al-Basalamah, Rostam Farrokhzad, the Persian commander who led a massive army to confront the caliphate, deliberately marched slowly as a strategy to cause Sa'd's army to lose their patience and incite a battle. However, al-Muthanna advised Sa'd to move to the periphery of Iraq's desert and avoid moving their army deep into Persian territory. Sa'd agreed, and he instructed his army to move according to al-Muthanna's advice.

Sa'd engaged in routine correspondence with the central government in Medina, as Sa'd diligently wrote about all developments, major and trivial, and sent at least two messengers every day to Umar. The caliph responded with a message that forbade Sa'd from preemptive attacks.

Pre-battle activities 
According to Tabari's account, the Parsig faction that steered the policies of the young Yazdegerd III was at odds with Rostam, the commander of the empire's most powerful army. Rostam urged patience and protracted warfare instead of outright assault on the Arab troops and exchanged letters with Zuhra ibn Hawiyah with the intention of making peace. Rostam's letters reminded Zuhrah of the tolerance, protection, and wealth the Persians had long given the people of Arabia; Zuhrah's reply acknowledged this, and stated that if the Persians converted to Islam, the Arab armies would withdraw and return only to Persia as merchants. Parvaneh Pourshariati speculates that this points to trade being a motivation behind the invasion of Persia. Tabari's narrative states that Rostam was prepared to convert in order to avoid military confrontation, but other factions in the Persian government refused to agree to such terms, and battle became an inevitability.

Islamic sources depict Sa'd as engaging in psychological warfare during this period by sending a series of hostile emissaries to taunt Rostam as he waited to receive further reinforcements sent by Abu Ubaidah ibn al-Jarrah, who had just won the Battle of Yarmuk.

The first envoy was Asim ibn Amr al-Tamimi, who was humiliated when Rostam gave him a basket filled with dirt, to which Asim responded with mocking commentary that the Persian "has agreed to give their lands to Muslims" before returning to the Muslim army to report. Sa'd then sent al-Mughira, who gave Rostam three choices: embrace Islam, surrender peacefully, or meet on the battlefield. Al-Mughira, trying to provoke Rostam, broke a sword that had been given to him as a gift. For the last envoy, rather than sending another noble or high-ranking Arab clansman, Sa'd instead sent Rib'i ibn Amir, a fierce Bedouin chieftain with no sense of courtesy, in order to confuse the Persians. Rib'i entered Rostam's chamber with his mule, dirtying the tent carpet and shocking Rostam's court. He gave Rostam three choices: embrace Islam, pay jizya to the caliphate, or war. Then Rib'i stated that his superiors would only give Rostam three days to think. He exited Rostam's encampment and returned to Sa'd. The sending of Rib'i is depicted as causing Rostam to lose his patience, causing him to prepare his army for battle.

As Rostam's army marched to the battlefield, Sa'd sent a dozen horsemen as scouts, led by Tulayha and Amr ibn Ma'adi Yakrib, who disguised themselves as Iraqi locals. They were to ride deep into Sassanid territories and up to the outskirts of Ctesiphon to gather intel regarding Rostam's forces. After two days of traveling, the scouts spotted the first vanguards of the army, which they estimated at 70,000. Tulayha and Ibn Ma'adi sent the scouts to report their findings to Sa'd, while Tulayha and Ibn Ma'adi continued to gather intel by themselves. They managed to trace the second and third waves, which they believed to be the center and rear of the army, numbering 100,000 and 70,000 respectively. Records from medieval chronicles reported that Ibn Ma'adi urged to Tulayha to return as they had achieved their mission, but Tulayha wished to wait for one more day. Tulayha instigated a one-man raid during the night and infiltrated inside the rear encampment where Rostam's tent was located. According to these accounts, Tulayha infiltrated the Sassanid camps under the cover of darkness, cut the ropes of the Sassanid tents, and used torches to ignite fires within the camp. This wrought havoc in the camps, killing two Sassanid soldiers. As the confused Sassanid army plunged into chaos, Tulayha took two horses and brought back a captive to Sa'd ibn Abi Waqqas.. The horses, according to Tulayha himself, belonged to Rostam. As Tulayha returned to Ibn Ma'adi, who had been waiting for him outside the camp, they immediately retreated with the stolen horses to tell Sa'd about the number of enemy forces.

The major battle in Qadisiyyah was preceded by a minor engagement against a portion of Sassanids in Uzaib; Sa prevailed in this minor engagement.

The battle 

While the Battle of Qadisiyyah occupies an important place in Islamic history for its symbolism in Persia's fall to the Muslim army, Islamic sources provide little information about the battle itself, focusing instead on heroic tales of fighters and tribes. Modern scholars hold that most details in works like al-Tabari's History of the Prophets and Kings consist of embellishments, with narrators recounting legendary tales of their fellow tribesmen, such as Sayf ibn Umar's emphasis on the heroics of al-Qa'qa, both of them members of the Banu Tamim. The date of the battle and the size of the forces involved both vary from source to source; modern historians assert only that the Persians outnumbered the invaders. Scholars have proposed that the battle took place in 636 or 637, with some suggesting an earlier date of 634 or 635. While the details of the battle are unlikely to be historically accurate, the different versions of the battle do share a few commonalities, including the absence of Sa'd himself from the battlefield, attributed to hemorrhoids or pox in various sources, and the death of the enemy commander Rostam. Al-Tabari's account of the fighting has formed the basis for many modern-day attempts to reconstruct the events of the battle.

According to Sa'd al-Ubaisi's reconstruction of the Battle of Qadisiyyah based on Al-Tabari's work, the battle occurred over four days, with Sa'd overseeing the battle from a tent overlooking the battlefield and the Persians relying upon their elephant corps:

 1st day, the day of Armath Asim ibn 'Amr lead the first clash together with Ibn Ma'adi and the Hawazin tribe under Rabi'ah ibn Uthman. They fought for a long time, and then the Sassanids dispatched their heavy cavalry and elephants to cause havoc among Muslim ranks. Sa'd, who oversaw the battlefield from his tent, ordered Asim to handle the elephants. Asim dispatched a squad that, according to Al-Qurtubi, had trained for days before the battle in special anti-elephant military drills consisting of maneuvering their horses around a huge wooden elephant doll. This cavalry aimed for the elephants' alpha male, which the Muslim army recognized by the animal's brighter skin and their perception that it was seemingly leading the other elephants. At the end of the day, there were no elephants left, and the left wing of the Muslim army managed to stall the onslaught of the Persian heavy cavalry.
 2nd day, the day of Agwath On November 17, the Muslims mobilized and fought to a deadlock as they tried to move the bodies of their fallen comrades to be buried. Suddenly, al-Qa'qa ibn Amr, right-hand man of Khalid ibn al-Walid, arrived on the battlefield and burst forward with his men to penetrate the brigade of Bahman Jaduya, the Sassanid right-wing commander. They killed Bahman, leaving the Sassanid right wing leaderless for the moment. It is said that al-Qa'qa engaged in 30 personal duels on this day.
 3rd day, the day of Imash The elephants returned to the battlefield and the situation became dire again for the Muslims, which prompted Sa'd to send urgent messages from his tent for available forces to concentrate on the elephants. Al-Qa'qa ordered massive-sized camels to swarm the elephant flanks, while the spearmen formed spear walls in front of the elephants. According to Ibn Kathir, the Muslims who were involved in slaughtering the elephants were al-Qa'qa, Tulayha, Ibn Ma'adi, Dhiraar ibn Azwar, Jarir ibn Abdullah al-Bajali, and Khalid ibn Urfuthah. The day ended with the elephant corps damaged beyond repair, as most of them were killed along with their riders, while many fled and became uncontrollable, trampling their own comrades and causing massive casualties to the Sassanids. The commander of the elephant corps, Jalinus, fled the battlefield after the Muslim forces gained upper hand. Sa'd ordered his men to chase and kill Jalinus, as he wanted the elephants to be permanently neutralized. A Tamim horseman named Zahra ibn Hawiyah at-Tamimi chased the elephant commander and killed him.
 4th day, the day of al-Qadisiyyah  The death of Rostam shocked the Sassanids, which prompted Sa'd to order a general assault.

Multiple stories about the death of Rostam were presented in Tabari's works:
 There was a heavy sandstorm facing the Persian army on the final day of the battle. Rostam lay next to a camel to shelter himself from the storm, while some weapons, such as axes, maces, and swords had been loaded on the camel. Hilāl ibn `Ullafah accidentally cut the girdle of the load on the camel, not knowing that Rostam was behind and under it. The weapons fell on Rostam and broke his back, leaving him half-dead and paralyzed. Hilal beheaded Rostam and shouted that he killed Rostam. Ibn Kathir's version also states that Hilal killed Rostam.
Another version from Ya'qubi records that a group including Dhiraar bin Al-Azwar, Tulayha, and Amru bin Ma'adi Yakrib discovered the corpse of Rostam.

After Rostam's death, al-Qa'qa and his Tamim cavalry were surrounded behind enemy lines, while the Muslim army carried out Sa'd's order to advance. Most of the Sassanid forces broke as the Muslims archers attacked the Sassanids relentlessly. As the Sassanid casualties mounted, they were finally routed and fled towards the river of Ateeq, where they were subject to further slaughter by the Tamim cavalry led by Zahra ibn Hawiyah.

News of the battle spread through Iraq, and many cities that had rebelled against the caliphate before succumbed to it again. Sa'd immediately sent news of his victory to Medina, where the caliph gathered the people of Medina to inform them of the victory.

Crossing of Tigris and conquest of Ctesiphon 

Shortly after the victory in Qadisiyyah, Sa'd commanded his forces to march again, as he aimed to subdue the Sassanid capital Ctesiphon. Sa'd rearranged his army again to the five-division formation. He appointed Zuhra ibn Hawiyah to the vanguard, which marched first to the north, and replaced Khalid ibn Arfatha with Hashim ibn Utbah, his step-nephew, as his deputy. Khalid was reappointed as the rear guard commander. As the vanguard reached Borsippa, Zuhra immediately defeated the remnants of Sassanid army under Busbuhra in the Battle of Burs. Sa'd met a force of Firuzan, which the caliphate army defeated easily. Then the forces under Sa'd marched again until they met more Sasanian resistance in Sawad. The Sasanids were defeated after their leader, Syahriyar, was defeated in a duel by a Muslim soldier named Abu Nabatah Naim al-Raji, who was given the crown and bracelets of Syahriyar as spoils of war.

After the town was pacified, Sa'd continued to march again until they pacified one of the Sassanid capital's suburbs, Bahurashir. Sa'd used the city as a military headquarters, while he sent smaller companies to gather intel. These small raiding parties did not find any hostile forces but brought 100,000 dirhams seized from local farmers. This prompted Sa'd to inform the caliph about his soldiers' conduct. Umar replied by forbidding the seizure of money and instructed the soldiers to instead offer the people a choice between converting to Islam or paying jizya. Sa'd sent Salman the Persian to offer the locals these two choices. This was received well by the locals, except the citizens of Bahurashir, who resisted behind their walls. Sa'd besieged Bahurashir and built 20 trebuchets to subdue the suburb. The garrison of Bahurashir sent raiding forces outside the wall to stop the trebuchets. Their efforts were repelled by Zuhrah ibn Hawiyah, who suffered injuries in protecting the machines. The siege continued until the garrison of Bahurashir suffered from supply and food shortages, which caused them to abandon Bahurashir and cross the Tigris River toward Al-Mada'in. After the garrison left, Sa'd entered the abandoned Bahurashir.

The Tigris was undergoing heavy tide at the time and crossing it without boats was impossible for the Rashidun forces. Sa'd was forced to wait until they could cross the river. Sa'd grew frustrated, as he was informed by locals that Yazdegerd III was going to move the treasury in Mada'in to Hulwan. That morning, Sa'd changed his mind and told the army that he was willing to take the risk, and the entire force should cross the river with their mounts despite the high tide. Sa'd reasoned that they needed to subdue Mada'in immediately and deny Yazdegerd any chance to use his wealth to build another army. The soldiers were hesitant, as the river torrents were so fierce, but as Sa'd motivated them they complied, and one by one they plunged themselves into the river and crossed it. Ibn Kathir reported that the Sassanids in al-Mada'in castle yelled "Crazy! They are crazy!", unable to believe that the Rasidun army attempted to cross the torrent without boats. The Sassanids attempted to intercept the crossing by sending their cavalries, but Asim on the vanguard easily repelled them by instructing his archers to aim for their horses' eyes, causing the blinded horses to move uncontrollably. The Persians abandoned their horses and ran on foot. As they ran, Asim commanded his forces to catch them. By the time they reached the Sassanid capital, Sa'd recovered from his sickness.

Wealth of Yazdegerd 

When the whole army had crossed the river, they immediately chased after the Persians who had fled to Madain. But they were unable to find the Persians, and Yazdegerd had evacuated his entire family and much of his property from the city. The caliphate's army managed to secure al-Mada'in's treasury, and also found the crown and gown of Yazdegerd in a sack loaded on a mule. They were immediately confiscated by Zuhra, who brought them to Sa'd.

They found the palace abandoned. Sa'd sent Salman to preach Islam in the subdued megalopolis. In the month of Safar, he gathered his troops to carry out Friday prayers in the palace. According to Ibn Shamil, this was the first Friday prayer established in country of Iraq, as Sa'd had intended to live in this palace. Sa'd appointed 'Amr ibn 'Amr al-Muzani to manage the spoils, and Salman to distribute a fifth of the spoils to the soldiers. Because the army consisted of mounted soldiers, each soldier got at least 12,000 silver dirhams. The rest were sent to Medina with Bayir ibn al-Khasasiyah.

When the wealth of the Persians reached Medina, Umar gave the golden bracelet of Yazdegerd to Suraqa bin Malik, a Kinana tribesman from Banu Midhlaj, as according to a hadith prophesied by Muhammad during the Hegira, Muhammad promised Suraqa the bracelets of Yazdegerd.

Governorate in Kufa 

Shortly after Sa'd conquered al-Madain, Umar ordered him to stabilize the conquered area before chasing down the Sassanid forces that fled to the mountains.

Sa'd heard that the people of Mosul had gathered at Tikrit under a figure named al-Antioch. Al-Antioch has gathered some Byzantine men as his allies, along with a man named Syaharijah and Arab Christian warriors from the tribes of Iyad, Taghlib, and an-Nimr. Sa'd wrote a letter to Umar about this news, and Umar replied by ordering him to launch a preemptive attack on Mosul. Sa'd appointed Abdullah ibn Mu'tam as the commander of the forces set to attack Mosul, with Rib'i bin al-Afkal al-Inazi as the vanguard. Sa'd appointed Al-Harith ibn Hassan on the right wing, Furat ibn Hayyan on the left wing, and Hani ibn Qais and Arfajah bin Harthama on the cavalry, with Arfajah the first to reach Tikrit. After they were finished in Tikrit, Ibn al-Mu'ta'm sent Rabi'i ibn al-Afkal and Arfajah to subdue Nineveh and Mosul before the news about Antiqa's defeat in Tikrit spread. Arfajah and Ibn al Mu'ta'm forced a surrender from both cities and subjected them to jizya.

As Yazdegerd fled to Hulwan, he gathered soldiers and followers in every territory passed until he mustered more than 100,000 soldiers and appointed Mihran as the commander of this huge army. According to John Paul C. Nzomiwu, Yazdegerd raised this massive army from Hulwan because he could not accept the defeat in al-Qadisiyyah. The army of Mihran dug a large ditch around them as a defense and dwelt in that place with a number of troops, supplies, and equipment. Sa'd requested further instruction from Umar, and the caliph ordered Sa'd to stay in al-Mada'in and appoint Hashim ibn Utbah as the leader of the troops to attack Jalula. Sa'ad executed these instructions and sent Hashim to lead the Rashidun troops to engage Mihran forces in the Battle of Jalula. Al-Qa'qa was appointed as vanguard, Malik ibn Si'r as right wing, 'Amr ibn Malik on the left, and 'Amr ibn Murrah al-Juhani as rearguard. The Rashidun troops sent to Jalula numbered 12,000 soldiers, which included veteran warriors from the muhajirun and Ansar from the tribal chiefs of the interior Arabs. It is said that the Muslims managed to seize spoils in the form of treasures, weapons, gold and silver which amounted to almost as much as the treasures they found in al-Madain and more than they received from Ctesiphon.

After the operation in Jalula, Umar ordered Hashim ibn Utbah to stay in Jalula, while al-Qa'qa should continue to pursue Yazdegerd to Hulwan. Al-Qa'qa clashed against another Sassanid force in Hulwan led by Kihran ar-Razi, who al-Qa'qa personally slaid in battle, while another Sassanid commander, Fairuzan, managed to escape. As Yazdegerd raised further resistance forces, Sa'd's troops under Arfajah chased them, sending the vanguard led by a Tamim warrior named  (known as Dhu al-Khuwaishirah at-Tamimi, the first Kharijite in history.) to face them. Hurqus managed to crush Yazdegerd's army under Hormuzan in Ahvaz (now known as Hormizd-Ardashir). The massive spoils of war which were acquired earlier now became a major problem for Sa'd due to complaints received by the caliph regarding Sa'd's uneven distribution of the spoils from Jalula. The complaint caused the caliph to recall Sa'd for questioning, while the caliph ordered a major investigation regarding the accusation towards Sa'd.

Founding of Kufa 

After the Arab armies had settled in al-Mada'in, Umar learned that many of the soldiers who had settled in Iraq were ill. The soldiers reported that they were sick because they resided "in a place that was not fit for camels". Later historians theorized that the soldiers in al-Mada'in became sick because they were not used to the non-desert climate of al-Mada'in, which was characterized by medieval chroniclers as a highly urbanized megalopolis with dense forest features. Umar sent Ammar ibn Yasir and Hudhayfah ibn al-Yaman to assist in Iraq and began searching places fit for the Arab army's settlement. Utbah ibn Ghazwan and Arfajah built a garrison town in Basra, while Sa'd moved towards what would become Kufa. He transported and dismantled walls and military structures from al-Mada'in to build a new garrison city or misr. The new misr was formally called Jund al-Kufah, which was a complex for the Muslim soldiers who settled in that area permanently along with their families. Sa'd made Kufa his permanent headquarters.

After Sa'd settled into Kufa, he instructed Hashim ibn Utbah to bring his forces towards locations in Khuzestan centered around Ahvaz to face Hormuzan, a fugitive commander who survived the Battle of al-Qadisiyyah. Utbah ibn Gahzwan also prepared his troops from Basra to the assist forces of Hashim. They won the battle and forced Hormuzan to flee from the area. Later, Umar learned that Yazdegerd mustered another army to attack the city of Basra. The caliph ordered Sa'd to send his troops to Ahvaz under the command of Al-Nu'man ibn Muqrin to confront this threat. Umar ordered Sa'd to appoint Jarir ibn Abdillah al-Bajili, Jarir ibn Abdillah al-Humairi, Suwaid ibn al-Muqarrin, and Abdullah bin Dzi as-Sahmain as field commanders. Umar wrote another letter to Abu Musa al-Ash'ari in Basra to send troops to Ahvaz under the command of Sahl ibn Adi, and instructed him to include powerful fighters such as al-Bara' ibn Malik, Asim ibn 'Amr, Mujaz'ah ibn Thawr as-Sadusi, Ka'b ibn Sur, Arfajah ibn Harthamah, Hudhayfah al-Bariqi, Abdurrahman ibn Sahl, al-Hushain ibn Ma'bad under the command of Abu Saburah ibn Abi Ruhm. This army successfully defeated the Sassanids and conquered most of Khuzestan.

Sa'd informed Umar of this, and Umar sent an army led by Dhiraar ibn al-Khattab, Al-Hudhayl Al-Asadi, and Abd Allah ibn Wahb al-Rasibi. This force successfully defeated the Persians in Masabzan and captured one of the Persian commanders. Sa'd named Dhiraar an administrator of the Masabzan area.

Umar then ordered the troops in Kufa to assist the army in Emesa, where Abu Ubaydah and Khalid ibn al-Walid were besieged by a Christian Arab army under the command of Heraclius. Sa'd sent al-Qa'qa and several thousand cavalries as reinforcements. As the besiegers of Emesa were repelled, Umar ordered al-Qa'qa to return to Iraq.

Dismissal from command 
In 638, Umar sent Muhammad ibn Maslamah to Kufa, as he heard of scandals involving Sa'd. Sa'd, the governor of Kufa, had built a public citadel next to his own house. The noise from the nearby market was so deafening that Sa'd had built a locked gate into the citadel, which prompted the caliph to send Ibn Maslama to destroy the gate, which he did by setting fire to it.  He refused all of Sa'd's offers of hospitality, and handed him a missive from Umar reminding him that the citadel should be available to the public, suggesting that he move his house. According to Asad Ahmed, the caliph also dispatched several intelligence officers, including a spy named Hashim ibn Walid ibn al-Mughira, to investigate Sa'd conduct. They found unanimous support and positive impressions from the Kufa residents towards Sa'd, except from the tribes of Bajila and Abs.

In 642, Ibn Maslamah was again sent to investigate complaints of Kufa's citizens towards Sa'd. Ibn Maslamah visited all the local mosques and heard the public's complaints. Nearly everyone expressed satisfaction with Sa'd's conduct as governor, but there was an accusation that he did not lead the prayers correctly and spent too much time hunting. Ibn Maslamah took Sa'd and his accusers back to Umar. Sa'd was proven innocent while the accuser was only spreading rumors, but Umar still replaced Sa'd as governor. According to al-Basalamah, this was because Umar wanted to minimize any potential scandals. He admitted that he trusted Sa'd, as they did not find any proven misconduct during their investigation. According to Asad Q. Ahmed, the complaints towards Sa'd were most likely due to the jealousy of several clans in Kufa towards Sa'd for his apparent high position as overlord of Iraq and for his closeness to his favorite general and nephew, Hashim ibn Utba, which was viewed as nepotism.

Later, on the eve of the Battle of Nahavand, Umar gathered a war council consisting of Sa'd, Uthman, Ali, Talha, Zubayr, and Abbas ibn Abd al-Muttalib.

Some narrations state that although ʿUmar removed him from his post as governor, he recommended that the caliph who succeeded him reinstall Saʿd, since Umar had not removed Saʿd due to any treachery. Later, Sa'd was one of six people nominated by Umar ibn al-Khattab for the third caliph. Umar left a will asking the third caliph to reappoint Sa'd as governor of Kufa, which was done by Uthman ibn al-Affan, who dismissed al-Mughira from Kufa and reappointed Sa'd as governor. Several years later, Sa'd was involved in a quarrell with Abdullah ibn Masud, as he could not pay his debt to the latter. This quarrell caused Uthman to remove Sa'd from his post and appoint Al-Walid ibn Utba ibn Abi Sufyan as his replacement.

First Muslim civil wars 
When the First Fitna broke out, Sa'd convinced many surviving Companions of the Prophet, including Ibn Abbas, Abdullah ibn Umar, Muhammad ibn Maslamah, Anas ibn Malik, Al-Qa'qa' ibn Amr al-Tamimi, Abu Ayyub al-Ansari, to remain neutral in the strife. Sa'd, along with Ibn Umar and Ibn Maslamah, rejected pleas for assisstance from the factions during the war. Many resented this extremely influential yet pacifistic faction led by Sa'd, as some thought their inactivity during the strife prevented a decisive result in the conflict. Sa'd's son Umar ibn Sa'ad was one of his father's critics.

Sa'd outlived all of the other ten blessed companions and died at the age of eighty, around the year 674. Judging by the portion of the last zakat he paid, Saad's wealth measured two hundred and fifty thousand dirhams on the day he died.

Legacy
As a figure with a long career in early Islamic history and its conquests, Sa'd left a rich legacy as a military figure and as an honored companion of Muhammad; legends surrounding him served as influences on China's Islamic tradition. Sa'd's characterization as a hero of Islam and the Arabs was used by Saddam Hussein to link himself to the conqueror of Iraq.

Islamic scholarship 

Sunni Muslims regard Sa'd as one of the ten to whom Paradise was promised, and he is famed for his participation in Badr and Uhud. Various verses of the Qur'an are said to have been inspired by him, including ayah 8 of Al-Ankabut, which commenters have suggested was inspired by Sa'd's steadfastness in Islam, and Luqman, verse 15, which urged Sa'd to be easy on his parents, as Islam emphasizes filial piety.

Various hadiths are attributed to Sa'd, including fifteen hadiths in Sahih Al-Bukhari and Muslim.  The Musnad Ahmad ibn Hanbal contains 177 hadiths attributed to him. Various prominent narrators such as Abdullah ibn Umar, Aisha, and Abdullah ibn Abbas also narrated from Sa'd, as Dhahabi recorded.

Several hadiths involving Sa'd have been used to explain the Islamic law of inheritance that restricts bequests to one-third of the estate when the deceased is survived by an heir. This law, which is not described in the Qu'ran, is largely based on a tradition in which a gravely ill Sa'd requests Muhammad's guidance in determining how much of his wealth he should bequeath to charity. The tradition has multiple variants, with some of them involving Umar instead of Muhammad, and may be an Umayyad-era retroactive justification for the policy.

Sa'd earned part of his income via muzara'a, a business model similar to sharecropping whereby the product was shared according to fixed ratio.

Architecture 

Sa'd is credited with the foundation of the city of Kufa adjacent to Al-Hirah, which was founded by the Lakhmid king Al-Nu'man III ibn al-Mundhir. The main roads of Kufa were twenty yards wide and thirty to forty-five feet long. According to Imamuddin, the town reached its zenith during the time of Umar, who called it Ras Islam. It was originally built as a permanent settlement for the Muslim army in Iraq. Sa'd had many public service structures built in the city, such as a canal named after him and a congregational mosque that was constructed for Friday prayers. It could accommodate 40,000 persons and had a wide veranda 100 yards long in front of the congregational hall. Its Dar al Imara structure was located south of its qibla wall. The Kufa grand mosque had later historical significance, as it became the place where the Hasan–Muawiya treaty occurred, where Hassan ibn Ali abdicated the position of caliph and recognized Mu'awiyah as the next caliph.

Ibn Shamil's al-Bidaya wa Nihaya named Sa'd the first to lead Friday prayers in Iraq, stating that he transformed the main hall of the palace of Ctesiphon into a congregational prayer area for the Muslim conquering forces.

Military 
Islamic scholars praise Sa'd for his two most important battles in Iraq: the battle of Qadisiyyah and the pacification of Ctesiphon. Bashamil considered the battle of al-Qadisiyyah the beginning of the permanent entrenchment of the caliphate's presence in Iraq, as almost all Iraqi cities that broke away from the caliphate when Khalid ibn al-Walid departed immediately succumbed to Sa'd. Sayf ibn Umar highlighted the effects of the battle beyond Iraq and Persian soils, reporting that the Arab tribe in Aden Abyan, Yemen, closely monitored the outcome in al-Qadisiyyah, believing that the result of the battle would even affect Yemen.

After the conquest of Ctesiphon, Sa'd sent most of the enormous spoils of war to Medina. The army commanded by Sa'd seized another enormous sum of wealth after the Battle of Jalula; according to Asad Ahmed, the spoils of Jalula were the biggest seizure during the conquest of Persia.

Alleged visit to Asia 

Saʿd has been traditionally credited by Hui Muslims with introducing Islam to China. According to Hui Muslim tradition, Sa'd came to China as an ambassador in 650 during the reign of Emperor Gaozong of Tang. The 17th century Hui scholar Liu Ch'ih instead credited Sa'd with introducing Islam to China in 616 AD after he moved to China from Abyssinia.

Despite several Chinese claimants as Sa'd's descendants, the claims that Sa'd visited China remains controversial among scholars. According to Donald Leslie, "Chinese Muslim tradition, with sources from the 14th century and later, has the Sahâba Sa’d ibn Abi Waqqâs, maternal cousin of the Prophet, conqueror of Persia and founder of Kufâh, sent with other envoys in 628, but it is highly unlikely that envoys were actually sent to China during the Prophet’s lifetime. Tabarî writes of envoys to Persia, Ethiopia and elsewhere, but does not mention China. We should note that besides the famous Guangzhou tomb for Waqqâs in China, there is one also in Medina, far more convincing". L. C. Harris remarked that most Arab historians reject the notion due to lack of records for such a journey by Sa'd. Maurice Gajan speculates that the local traditions about Sa'd are linked to some Muslim traders from the West Asia establishing small communities in the coastal towns of Quanzhou, Guangzhou, and Yangzhou during early medieval periods. Sa'd is nonetheless an important figure in Chinese Muslims' cultural heritage, particularly the mosques and tombs that are attributed to him by local Muslims.

In Central Asia, his name is often transcribed as "Saduakas" (Sadvakas), which is a very common name among the nomadic peoples of Central Asia.

Character analysis 
Saʿd was born in Mecca in 595. His father was Abu Waqqas Malik ibn Uhayb ibn Abd Manaf ibn Zuhrah from the Banu Zuhrah clan of the Quraysh tribe. Saʿd's mother was Hamnah bint Sufyan ibn Umayya ibn Abd Shams ibn Abd Manaf. Sa'd was related to Muhammad, as the prophet's mother Aminah hailed from Sa'd's clan, the Banu Zuhrah. Sa'd had many children, including sons named Umar ibn Sa'ad and Amir and a daughter named A'isha.

He had a short or medium stature according to medieval Arab Sources, dark skin, and a pug nose. He was said to have a muscular build.

Sa'd was known for his skill in mounted archery, and was known as the "first Muslim archer" after the Expedition of Ubaydah ibn al-Harith. Muslim scholars viewed Sa'd's archery skills in this battle as being "gifted (by God)". It is said that after the Battle of Uhud, his peers praised Sa'd for his battlefield heroism and for his deed in securing Muhammad's safety.

Leadership 

During his tenure as the commander of the army in Iraq, Sa'd was a strategic command figure, a far cry from his younger days during the era of Muhammad as frontline hero. Imamuddin regarded Sa'd as wise ruler during his governorate in Iraq. Asad Q. Ahmed remarks that Sa'd was politically astute during his duty in Iraq as he engaged in active roles against Umar over financial and political matters.

Sa'd relayed all progression of the frontline to Umar. Common views usually give Sa'd credit for the victory in Qadisiyyah, though scholarship focuses more on the figures behind his success in that battle. Sa'd's leadership was characterized by his liberal stance towards lower officers, as Sa'd usually give his subordinates freedom to express their ideas, whether by relying on the wisdom of strategy experts such as al-Muthanna, Asim, al-Mughira and Arfajah or by allowing decisive commanders like Tulayha, al-Qa'qa ibn 'Amr, and 'Amr ibn Ma'adi-Karib to mount their own initiatives during battle. Sa'd's leadership style allowed creative field commanders like al-Qa'qa to utilize their creativity.

Another factor for Sa'd's victory in al-Qadisiyyah was the quality of his archers, as Rashidun archers were typically precise and powerful shooters, akin to Byzantine archers in the Battle of Callinicum. This powerful archery style allowed Rashidun archers to easily overcome Sassanid archers who preferred the rapid, showering Panjagan archery technique, as the former packed more punch and range than the latter during the Muslim conquest of Persia. Sassanid arrows failed to pierce Rashidun armor or shields, while the arrows of Muslim archers were able to penetrate the mail and double cuirass of Sassanid warriors. In short, many of Sa'd's brilliant victories against Persians were due to the brilliance of his subordinates.

However, al-Basalamah remarked that Sa'd himself was inventive in warfare, and highlighted how Sa'd departed from the orthodox "five division" formation into the thinner six division variation. or camelier corps. Sa'd also trained his cavalry wings to act like a pendulum, an implementation of the Karr wa Farr (engage-and-disengage) classical Arabian warfare strategy, where the cavalry charged and retreated to their starting position, with the other cavalry wing reacting in the opposite direction. Muslim scholars also highlighted Sa'd's emissary exchange with Rostam, successfully provoked Rostam to act first and draw his army to the field.

Relation with the Caliphs 
Abu Bakr trusted Sa'd as one his personal guards, and Sa'd played a significant role during the first stage of the Ridda Wars, such as defending Medina. and the pacification of Daumat al Jandal.

Sa'd was said to have a good relationship with Umar, who tended to micromanage his governors and generals. The caliph often took charge of Sa'd's general movements, as in the Battles of al-Qadisiyyah and Jalulua or the assignment of field commander compositions for many operations. However, Sa'd did not object to Umar's orders on when to engage in battle. In fact, Sa'd intensified his correspondences with Umar by creating an intensive communication system between Medina and the frontline, so that the caliph had a comprehensive understanding of the developments in Qadisiyyah. This trust continued until the later scandal during Sa'd's time as the governor of Kufa, where Umar said he still trusted Sa'd, but was forced him to replace him with another governor. The decision to remove Sa'd was not personal, but was necessary to prevent further scandals.

Sa'd was one of six people nominated by Umar ibn al-Khattab for the third caliphate, which resulted in the unanimous decision to elect Uthman, who carried out the will of Umar to reinstall Sa'd as governor by dismissing al-Mughira. Several years later, the relationship soured as Sa'd became involved in quarrels with Abdullah ibn Masud due to Sa'd inability to pay a debt to the latter. This quarrel has roused to Uthman, who removed Sa'd again from the governorate of Kufa and appointed Al-Walid ibn Utba ibn Abi Sufyan as his replacement.

During the First Fitna, Sa'd and the majority of the surviving companions of the Prophet remained neutral, Many resented this influential yet pacifistic faction led by Sa'd and Ibn Maslama, as some thought their inactivity prevented a decisive result in the conflict. Modern analysts have theorized that this neutrality was based on Sa'd's belief that the search for Uthman's murderer should not drag the caliphate into civil war A hadith states that after the civil war ended, both Sa'd and Mu'awiyah agreed that no one should revile or curse Ali.

Family tree 

|-
|style="text-align: left;"|

Descendants 
Sa'd's descendants gained some degree of influence within the caliphate's political sphere, particularly within the late Rashidun and early Umayyad eras. Some of his descendants in the Caliphate of Cordoba gained prominence, such .

Early caliphate 

According to Asad Q. Ahmed, Sa'd's clan was closely related to the southern Arabs, their main allies. Sa'd had children from two Kinda women. The first was Mawiyah bint Qays, who bore him three daughters and two sons. The second was Umm Hilal bint Rabi', a daughter of a war camel breeder in Kufa. Umm Hilal bore Sa'd three children. Sa'd also had a wife from the Banu Bahra' clan of the Quda'a tribe, which claimed descent from Ma'ad ibn Adnan This woman was named Makita bint Amr, with the kunya Umm Amir. Makita bore four children. Sa'd's wife Salma bint Khasafah bore him six children. He had at least eight more wives from various tribes.

Sa'd's daughters with Mawiyyah married influential men of the caliphate, such as Al-Mughira ibn Shu'bah, Sa'd's lieutenant and a high-ranked sahaba hailing from the Banu Thaqif, and Ibrahim ibn Abd ar Rahman, son of Abd al-Rahman ibn Awf, an extremely wealthy Qurayshite noble from Zuhra clan and one of the ten to whom Paradise was promised. This tied the two prominent Zuhrite households together. Ibrahim, who was a prominent judge in Baghdad during the time of al-Rashid, had son from Sa'd's daughter who was appointed the Shurta of Medina. According to Asad Q. Ahmed, the most notable of Sa'd and Mawiyah's sons was Umar ibn Sa'ad, as he was the most enthusiastic to make his own name in political sphere. Umar ibn Sa'd was trusted by Ubayd Allah ibn Ziyad, as Umar served him well during the Battle of Karbala and helped Ubayd Allah become the governor Rayy and Hamadan. After the death of Yazid I, Umar gained even greater influence than Ubayd Allah as he secured strong support from the tribe of Kinda and was appointed as governor of Iraq, despite being reviled by the citizens of Kufa due to his involvement in the death of Husayn ibn Ali. Sa'd's son Muhammad fought against the Umayyads during the Battle of al-Harra and in the rebellion of Ibn al-Ash'ath.

Sa'd's marriages to the women from Banu Bakr bin Wail and Taghlib bin Wail gave his descendants an alliance with those tribes. Sa'd's sons from these tribes were close to the Alids, such as Kharija ibn Sa'd, a narrator of the hadiths of Al-Tabarani. Kharija married the daughter of Abd Allah ibn al-Zubayr, and their son was appointed as a sadaqah collector of the Zubayrids. The son of Sa'd and the Taghlibid woman Khawla al-Taghlib, Mus'ab ibn Sa'd, reportedly narrated traditions from Ali. Mus'ab was engaged to the daughter of Hashim ibn Utba, Sa'd own nephew and an influential Alid faction personality. Mus'ab also married the daughter of Hasan ibn Farqad, one of Ali's supporters in the Battle of the Camel. This further strengthened the ties between Sa'd's children and the Alids.

Sa'd's children with his Quda'a wife, Makita bint Amir al-Bahra, were all married into the Zuhra clan.

The wife of Sa'd from the Banu Talabah clan was Salma, the widow of deceased al-Muthanna ibn Haritha. Sa'd and Salma's children possessed both ties to both the Umayyads and Alids. Their daughter Umm Ishaq married Hashim ibn Utba, a prominent Alid and Sa'd's nephew. Two of their other daughters, Umm 'Amr and Umm Ayyub, married Muhammad ibn Jubayr ibn Muṭʽim al-Abd Manaf, a strong Umayyad supporter. Their sons Umayr al-Asghar and 'Amr were killed during the Battle of al-Harra.

Asad Q. Ahmed states that Sa'd's children and grandchildren gained prominence during the early years of the Umayyad caliphate and were particularly popular with the southern Arab tribes due to his marriage alliances. Their prominence dwindled after the rise of Marwanids, who favored the Syrian-based northern Arabs at the expense of the southerners.

Caliphate of Cordoba 
Sa'd's descendant Ibrahim ibn Muhammad as-Sa'di al-Zuhri, better known as Ibn al-Aflaily, was a grammarian and linguist in the Caliphate of Córdoba. According to Yaqut al-Hamawi, Ibrahim descended from Sa'd's son Khalid, with his full lineage being Ibrahim ibn Muhammad ibn Zakaria ibn Mufarrij ibn Yahya ibn Ziyad ibn Abdullah ibn Khalid ibn Sa'd ibn Abi Waqqas. According to Ibn Bashkuwāl, Muhammad II of Córdoba appointed Ibn al-Aflaily as a minister during his reign.

Notes

See also
Emperor Gaozong of Tang
Al-Mughira
Rashidun cavalry
Sunni view of the Sahaba
The ten to whom Paradise was promised
List of Sahabah

References

Citations

Bibliography

External links

https://web.archive.org/web/20051031062214/http://www.alinaam.org.za/fazaail/umar.html
https://web.archive.org/web/20160303191053/http://www.muslimaccess.com/sunnah/seerah/10a.htm

595 births
664 deaths
Generals of the medieval Islamic world
Arab generals
Banu Zuhrah
History of the foreign relations of China
Islam in China
Diplomats from the medieval Islamic world
Sahabah who participated in the battle of Badr
Sahabah who participated in the battle of Uhud
Shahnameh characters
Rashidun governors of Kufa
Sahabah hadith narrators
People of the Muslim conquest of Persia
7th-century diplomats
Generals of the Rashidun Caliphate
City founders